A petting zoo (also called a children's zoo, children's farm, or petting farm) features a combination of domesticated animals and some wild species that are docile enough to touch and feed. In addition to independent petting zoos, many general zoos contain a petting zoo. 

Most petting zoos are designed to provide only relatively placid, herbivorous domesticated animals, such as sheep, goats, pigs, rabbits or ponies, to feed and interact physically with safety. This is in contrast to the usual zoo experience, where normally wild animals are viewed from behind safe enclosures where no contact is possible. A few provide wild species (such as pythons or big cat cubs) to interact with, but these are rare and usually found outside Western nations.

History
In 1938, the London Zoo included the first children's zoo in Europe and the Philadelphia Zoo was the first in North America to open a special zoo just for children.

During the 1990s, Dutch cities began building petting zoos in many neighbourhoods, so that urban children could interact with animals.

Animals and food
Petting zoos feature a variety of domestic animals. Common animals include cattle, zebu, yaks, sheep, goats, rabbits, guinea pigs, ponies, alpacas, llamas, pigs, miniature donkeys, miniature horses, ducks, geese, chickens, turkeys, and guineafowl. They occasionally contain a few exotic animals such as kangaroos, wallabies, emus, deer, zebras, parrots, porcupines, camels, ostriches, coatis, iguanas, capybaras, lemurs, tortoises and others.  

Petting zoos are popular with small children, who will often feed the animals. In order to ensure the animals' health, the food is supplied by the zoo, either from vending machines or a kiosk. Food often fed to animals includes grass and crackers and also in selected feeding areas hay is a common food. Such feeding is an exception to the usual rule about not feeding animals.

Mobile petting zoos 
Some petting zoos are also mobile and will travel to a home for a children's party or event. Many areas have a qualified mobile petting zoo. One of the first mobile petting zoos in Australia (begun in 1992), was Kindifarm. As a result of its popularity, many Australians use the term kindy farms to describe petting zoos. In Australia, mobile petting zoos are allowed in schools, child care centres and even shopping centres. For many children, a mobile petting zoo is their first opportunity to see and touch an animal.

Health effects 
Touching animals can result in the transmission of diseases between animals and humans (zoonosis) so it is recommended that people should thoroughly wash their hands before and after touching the animals. There have been several outbreaks of E. coli etc.

See also

Cat café
Pet rental

References

Children's entertainment
Early childhood education
Play (activity)
Zoos
Articles needing infobox zoo
Entertainment